Enterprise Radio Network was an all-sports radio network which operated briefly in 1981. It featured sports newscasts twice an hour, and sports talk during the evening and overnight.

Creation and programming
Enterprise Radio was created by Scott Rasmussen, the son of Bill Rasmussen, who was the founder of ESPN.  The all sports radio network went on the air in January 1981 and lasted until September 21, 1981.  The network broadcast sports reports twice an hour and did live phone in sports talk from 6 p.m. to 8 a.m. Eastern Time seven days a week.

Talk show hosts and update announcers included John Sterling, the current voice of the New York Yankees; Don Chevrier, the longtime TV voice of the Toronto Blue Jays; network radio veterans John O'Reilly, Dan Davis and Bob Buck; Curt Chaplin, the announcer for the iconic TV show, The People's Court; Jay Howard, the radio voice of the San Antonio Spurs' first NBA championship; and Bill Denehy, a former major league pitcher. The network reached approximately 74 stations nationwide at its peak, with most local stations broadcasting the talk shows and the sports reports to supplement their local programming.

ER also carried the 1981 Stanley Cup Finals and did extensive coverage of the National Sports Festival in Syracuse, New York. Network radio veteran John Chanin was the executive producer.

Struggle to keep afloat
While the station had hired over 100 reporters, announcers and producers from across the country, they failed to secure enough advertising to keep the operation afloat. The final six weeks of existence saw the staff go without pay, hoping an investor would save the network. It did not happen and the last broadcast was the overnight show with Greg Gilmartin that ended at 8 a.m. on the 21st.

Aftermath
Two Enterprise Radio interns, Kevin Harlan and Sean McDonough, became network play-by-play announcers.

The Rasmussens failed to pay into State of Connecticut unemployment fund and were arrested in late 1981. (Hartford Courant)  A settlement where employees received a small percentage of money owed was finalized in 1982 (Hartford Courant).

In 2010, John Birchard, who served as auto racing reporter for the network, wrote a book about Enterprise titled Jock Around the Clock - The Story of History's First All-Sports Radio Network.

See also
 List of United States radio networks

References

Sports radio in the United States
Defunct radio networks in the United States
Radio stations established in 1981
Radio stations disestablished in 1981
Mass media companies established in 1981
Mass media companies disestablished in 1981
1981 establishments in Connecticut
1981 disestablishments in Connecticut
Defunct radio stations in the United States